William Edward Phipps (February 4, 1922 – June 1, 2018) was an American actor and producer, sometimes credited simply as William Phipps, known for his roles in films and on television.

Early years

Hometown
Phipps grew up in St. Francisville, Illinois. His parents divorced when he was six years old. By the time he was in high school, he was using his stepfather's last name of Couch. He developed a love of acting at a young age and performed in several plays in grade school and high school. One of the plays in which he performed, during his junior year of high school in 1937, was Before Morning, a 1933 play made into a film that same year.

College
After graduating from high school in 1939, he attended Eastern Illinois University in Charleston, Illinois, where he majored in accounting, was elected freshman class president and served as head cheerleader.  After two years of college, he moved to Hollywood, to pursue a career in acting and resumed his original last name of Phipps.

World War II
During that same year, the United States entered into World War II, and Phipps enlisted in the United States Navy, serving as a radio operator on several ships all across the Pacific. He served three years, then settled in Los Angeles to begin his career. He enrolled in the Actors' Lab in Hollywood, alongside fellow actor Russell Johnson.

Hollywood
Phipps' big break came when he and Johnson were double-cast in a play at the Actors Lab. They drew straws to see which actor would perform in the matinée, and which would take the evening show. Phipps drew the evening show, which was attended that same evening by actor Charles Laughton. Laughton was impressed by Phipps' performance, and came backstage afterwards to ask Phipps to perform in Laughton's own play. Phipps' career took off, and he was soon in his first feature film, Crossfire (1947). In 1949, Phipps auditioned for the speaking voice of Prince Charming in the upcoming Disney film Cinderella. The studio was pleased with his performance and Phipps was offered the part by Walt Disney himself.

In 1959 he guest starred as "Ken Wills" a cheated card player in Bat Masterson, teaming up with the star to clean out a town of crooked poker dealers in the episode "License To Cheat" (S1E17).

In 1962 he guest starred on the TV Western Gunsmoke as weak husband “Ham” in S7E33's “The Prisoner”.

Hawaii
After nearly thirty years in the business, performing in film and television in a wide variety of roles, Phipps took a break from Hollywood and moved to Hawaii. While there, he hosted a movie presentation program called "Hollywood Oldies", on Maui's Cable 7. 
After a little more than five years in Hawaii, he returned to Hollywood to portray President Theodore Roosevelt in the 1976 television movie Eleanor and Franklin.

Retirement and post-career
Phipps' last movie role was in the 2000 independent film Sordid Lives, in which he also served as one of the film's producers. In 2005, several of Phipps' films were the subject of an EIU (Eastern Illinois University) film festival in his honor. He received an honorary doctorate from the university the following year.

Death 
Phipps died on June 1, 2018, in Santa Monica, California, at the age of 96 from lung cancer. He is buried in Valley Oaks Memorial Park.

Filmography

References

External links

 
 
 
 
William Edward "Bill" Phipps fan page at Facebook
Interview with William Phipps in Tom Weaver's book "Double Feature Creature Attack", at Google Books

1922 births
2018 deaths
20th-century American male actors
Film producers from California
American male film actors
American male voice actors
United States Navy personnel of World War II
Burials at Valley Oaks Memorial Park
Eastern Illinois University alumni
People from Lawrence County, Illinois
People from Vincennes, Indiana
People from Malibu, California
Male actors from Indiana
Military personnel from Indiana
United States Navy sailors
Deaths from lung cancer in California
Film producers from Illinois
Film producers from Indiana